Alicia Leal Veloz (born November 15, 1957)  is a Cuban painter. She was born in Sancti Spíritus, Cuba.

Art 
Leal's work focuses on women and the relationship between women and men, and they are known for their flat perspective with intricate and narrative details. Her paintings take inspiration from folk art. Leal works from the studio she owns with her husband and fellow painter Juan Moreira. Their studio is located in El Vedado in Havana, Cuba. Her work is a part of permanent collections at world-class institutions such as the National Museum of Fine Art in Havana and the Spanish Embassy at the United Nations Headquarters in New York City.

Leal is a 1980 graduate of the San Alejandro Fine Arts School, known as the first art school in Cuba. She is also a member of the National Union of Writers and Artists of Cuba (UNEAC) and the International Association of Art (IAA/AIAP).

Exhibitions 
Leal has participated in nearly one-hundred collective exhibitions,]]  including:
 2002—Unveiling Shades (Photographies). La Acacia Art Gallery, Havana, Cuba. 
2001—Fantasies by Two (Joint exhibit with artist Juan Moreira). Sancti Spiritus Art Gallery, Cuba.
 2001—Alicia Leal (Graphic, Drawing and Mosaic Art). Art Gallery in Colón, Matanzas, Cuba.
 2000—Juan Moreira and Alicia Leal. Paintings, Drawings and Mosaic Art. Meliá Varadero Hotel, Cuba.
 2000—Mosaic Art and Paintings, Alicia Leal and Juan Moreira. José Martí Monument, Havana, Cuba.
 1999—Alicia Leal ("A Guitarra Limpia" concert by Carlos Varela), Pablo de la Torriente Brau Cultural Center, Havana, Cuba.
 1999—Alicia Leal. Avellaneda Hall, National Theater of Cuba. Havana, Cuba.
 1999—Alice in the Center of Wonders. Pablo de la Torriente Brau Cultural Center, Havana, Cuba.
 1997—Juan Moreira and Alicia Leal. La Acacia Art Gallery, Havana, Cuba.
 1994—Juan Moreira and Alicia Leal. Chelsea Art Gallery, Kingston, Jamaica.
 1992—Tales While Walking. Espacio Abierto Art Gallery, Revolución y Cultura Magazine, Havana, Cuba.
 1988—Alicia Leal. Robinson Gallery, Houston, Texas, US.
 1987—Alicia Leal Exhibit. Habana Libre Hotel, Havana, Cuba.
 1986—Alicia Leal. Ernest Thaelman Art Gallery, Berlin, Germany.
 1985—When I See a Tree. 23 y 12 Art Center, Havana, Cuba.
 1984—Alicia Leal, drawings and paintings. Homage to José Fowler. Culture House of Plaza municipality, Havana, Cuba.

References

External links 
 
 

1957 births
Cuban painters
Cuban women painters
Living people
Academia Nacional de Bellas Artes San Alejandro alumni